Brook Kerr (born November 21, 1973) is an American actress who is best known for her portrayal of Whitney Russell Harris on the television soap opera Passions and Dr. Portia Robinson on ABC's General Hospital.

Personal life
She is a native of Indianapolis, Indiana.
Kerr moved to Los Angeles after graduating high school to pursue a career in acting. 

She had her son when she was 16 years old with long-time boyfriend Christopher Warren. Kerr and Warren have been together since their teens, but separated in 2009. Her son Chris Warren Jr. is also an actor; he has appeared as Zeke in High School Musical, High School Musical 2, and High School Musical 3.

She is featured in Kenny Chesney's video for his new single "Everybody Wants to Go to Heaven". She was also in 3T's music video "Why" feat. Michael Jackson in 1995. And she was in the Beenie Man Girls Dem Sugar Music Video Featuring American R&B Singer Mýa.

Career
After a variety of guest starring roles, Kerr's first role in a main cast was on the soap opera Passions where she starred as Whitney Russell Harris from the show's debut in 1999 until 2007. In 2008, she starred as Tara Thornton in the unaired first pilot of the HBO TV series True Blood, and was subsequently replaced by Rutina Wesley for that role. After guest roles in series such as NCIS: Los Angeles and Hawaii Five-O, in 2020 she joined the cast of General Hospital as Dr. Portia Robinson

References

External links

1973 births
American soap opera actresses
Living people
Actresses from Indianapolis
African-American actresses
20th-century American actresses
21st-century American actresses
20th-century African-American women
20th-century African-American people
21st-century African-American women
21st-century African-American people